The 1974 Peachtree Corners Classic, also known as the Atlanta WCT, was a men's tennis tournament played on indoor carpet courts at the Alexander Memorial Coliseum in Atlanta, Georgia in the United States that was part of the Blue Group of the 1974 World Championship Tennis circuit. It was the third edition of the tournament and was held from March 25 through March 31, 1974. Seventh-seeded Dick Stockton won the singles title and the accompanying $10,000 first-prize money

Finals

Singles
 Dick Stockton defeated  Jiří Hřebec 6–2, 6–1
 It was Stockton's first singles title of his career.

Doubles
 Bob Lutz /  Stan Smith defeated  Brian Gottfried /  Dick Stockton 6–3, 3–6, 7–6

References

External links
 ITF tournament edition details

Peachtree Corners Classic
Peachtree Corners Classic